The black bittern (Ixobrychus flavicollis) is a bittern of Old World origin, breeding in tropical Asia from Pakistan, India, Bangladesh and Sri Lanka east to China, Indonesia, and Australia. It is mainly resident, but some northern birds migrate short distances.

Description

Compared to related species, it has a longish neck and long yellow bill. The adult is uniformly black above, with yellow neck sides. It is whitish below, heavily streaked with brown. The juvenile is like the adult, but dark brown rather than black. They can be difficult to see, given their skulking lifestyle and reed bed habitat, but tend to fly fairly frequently when the all black upperparts makes them unmistakable.

Breeding
Their breeding habitat is reed beds. They nest on platforms of reeds in shrubs, or sometimes in trees. Three to five eggs are laid.

Diet
Black bitterns feed on insects, fish, and amphibians.

Conservation status

Australia
Black bitterns are not listed as threatened on the Australian Environment Protection and Biodiversity Conservation Act 1999.

State of Victoria, Australia
 The black bittern is listed as threatened on the Victorian Flora and Fauna Guarantee Act (1988).  Under this act, an Action Statement for the recovery and future management of this species has not yet been prepared.
 On the 2007 advisory list of threatened vertebrate fauna in Victoria, the black bittern is listed as vulnerable.

Gallery

References

 Birds of India by Grimmett, Inskipp and Inskipp, 

black bittern
black bittern
Birds of South Asia
Birds of Southeast Asia
Birds of Oceania
black bittern
Birds of Nepal